Alexander Galt Highet (c. 1914 – 14 October 1940) was a Scottish amateur footballer who made one appearance in the Scottish League for Queen's Park as a left back.

Personal life 
Highet served as an able seaman in the Royal Naval Volunteer Reserve during the Second World War. He was killed in the English Channel when HMT Lord Stamp hit a naval mine on 14 October 1940. Highet is commemorated on the Portsmouth Naval Memorial.

Career statistics

References 

Scottish footballers
Military personnel from Glasgow
Queen's Park F.C. players
Scottish Football League players
Association football fullbacks
Year of birth missing
Place of birth missing
Royal Naval Volunteer Reserve personnel of World War II
1940 deaths
Royal Navy personnel killed in World War II
1910s births
Royal Navy sailors
Footballers from Glasgow